Polar Bear was an American alternative rock band that was active in the late 1990s, formed and led by bassist Eric Avery.

History 
After the 1991 break-up of Jane's Addiction, Eric Avery and guitarist Dave Navarro formed the band Deconstruction, which released its sole album in 1994. After that project ended, Avery formed Polar Bear with drummer/programmer Harold "Barefoot" Saunders, formerly of Ethyl Meatplow. Guitarists Dani Tull and Andy Troy also contributed to the band. They released two EPs in 1996 and 1997, and the full-length album Why Something Instead of Nothing? in 1999.

Discography
Polar Bear (EP, 1996) 
Chewing Gum (EP, 1997)
Why Something Instead of Nothing? (1999)

References

Musical groups from Los Angeles
Man's Ruin Records artists